The Nillahcootie Dam, a rock and earth-fill embankment dam with a unique Gothic arch-shaped crest spillway across the Broken River that is located near , in the Alpine region of Victoria, Australia. The dam's purpose is for the supply of potable water and for irrigation. The impounded reservoir is called Lake Nillahcootie.

Location and features
Designed and constructed by the State Rivers and Water Supply Commission of Victoria, the dam was completed in 1967. The core component materials of the wall include  of rock and earth.

When full, flood flows spill over a unique Gothic arch-shaped crest. The storage also features a secondary spillway that is operated only during severe floods. It uses the ‘fuse plug' principle, in which a section of earthen embankment within the secondary spillway (the fuse plug) has been designed so that at a predetermined flood level it will be eroded away and increase the discharge through the spillway.

Recreation
It is a popular water-skiing destination, especially during the summer.

The name is of Indian origin and is thought to mean "Blue House".

See also

 List of dams in Victoria

References

External links

Lakes of Victoria (Australia)
Goulburn Broken catchment
Rivers of Hume (region)
Victorian Alps
Rock-filled dams
Earth-filled dams
Embankment dams
Dams completed in 1967
1967 establishments in Australia
Dams in the Murray River basin